Real Estate Building is a historic commercial building located at Bangor, Northampton County, Pennsylvania.  It was built between 1905 and 1907, and is a five-story, brick and stone building with a 1 1/2 story rear brick addition. It sits on a prominent corner in Bangor and has a curved bay window at the corner.  The sides feature two sets of three vertical bay windows.  The building has Italianate and Georgian Revival stylistic details.

It was added to the National Register of Historic Places in 1986.

References

Commercial buildings on the National Register of Historic Places in Pennsylvania
Office buildings completed in 1907
Italianate architecture in Pennsylvania
Georgian Revival architecture in Pennsylvania
Buildings and structures in Northampton County, Pennsylvania
National Register of Historic Places in Northampton County, Pennsylvania
1907 establishments in Pennsylvania